Hypocrisy is the act of pretending to have beliefs, opinions, virtues, feelings, qualities, or standards that one does not actually have.

Hypocrisy may also refer to:

 Hypocrisy (band), a melodic death metal band
 Hypocrisy (album), a 1999 album by melodic death metal band Hypocrisy
 Appeal to hypocrisy, a kind of logical fallacy

See also
Hypocrite (disambiguation)
Hippocrates (disambiguation)